Group One, Group 1, Grade I or G1 is the term used for the highest level of Thoroughbred and Standardbred stakes races in many countries. In Europe, the level of races for Thoroughbred racing is determined using the Pattern race system introduced in 1971 and monitored by the European Pattern Committee. To attain or maintain a Group One status, the average rating for the first four finishers in the race must be 115 or higher over a three-year period. The International Federation of Horseracing Authorities works to ensure consistent international standards. Group One races may only be restricted to age groups or a stipulated sex: they should not be restricted to horses bred in a certain country (though there are regional exceptions to this rule). Group One (G1) races may be run under handicap conditions in Australia, but in Europe weight-for-age conditions always apply.

In the United States, Canada, Japan, South Africa, and British National Hunt racing  "Grade I" is used instead; see List of British flat horse races. Race grading was introduced in North America in 1974.

These races, whether designated as "Group One" or "Grade I", are of international importance and attract the best horses. They also offer very large stake money. For example, the minimum purse for a Grade I race in North America in 2016 was $300,000. The minimum purse for a Group I race in Australia for 2016 was A$350,000.

See also
 Group races
 Graded stakes race
 List of Group One races in Great Britain
 List of Australian Group races
 List of South American Group races
 List of American and Canadian Graded races

References

Horse races